Irving Martin Abella  (July 2, 1940 – July 3, 2022) was a Canadian historian who served as a professor at York University from 1968 to 2013. He specialized in the history of the Jews in Canada and the Canadian labour movement.

Early life
Abella was born in Toronto on July 2, 1940.  His parents were Esther (Shiff) and Louis Abella.  He studied at the University of Toronto, obtaining a Bachelor of Arts in 1963 and a Master of Arts the following year.  He commenced his doctoral studies at the University of California, Berkeley, before returning to the University of Toronto and being awarded a Doctor of Philosophy in 1969.  He wrote his thesis on Canadian labour history.

Career
Abella first taught at York University in 1968, specializing in labour and Jewish history.  He continued teaching at that institution until 2013.  During the early 1970s, he started the first university course in Canadian Jewish studies at Glendon College, which he considered his greatest achievement.  He served as president of the Canadian Jewish Congress from 1992 to 1995.  He was also chair of Vision TV, a religious broadcaster.

Abella's books include Coat of Many Colours: Two Centuries of Jewish Life in Canada (1990) and None Is Too Many: Canada and the Jews of Europe, 1933–1948 (1982).  He stated that the latter – which detailed the Canadian government's immigration policy during the 1930s that led it to accept only 5,000 Jewish refugees during World War II – was not intended to be more than an academic text.  However, it ultimately impacted the immigration policy of the government at the time.  After Ron Atkey, the minister of immigration, read a draft copy of the manuscript, the Canadian government welcomed 50,000 Vietnamese boat people by the end of 1980 (up from the original goal of 8,000 refugees per year).

Personal life and death
Abella married Rosalie Silberman Abella in 1968.  They met while studying at the University of Toronto together, and remained married until his death.  She was later appointed to the Supreme Court of Canada in August 2004.  Together, they have two children, Jacob and Zachary.

Abella died on July 3, 2022, one day after his 82nd birthday.  He suffered from an unspecified long illness prior to his death.

Awards and honours
Abella was a fellow of the Royal Society of Canada.  He was conferred the National Jewish Book Award in 1983 under the Holocaust category for None Is Too Many: Canada and the Jews of Europe, 1933–1948.  He was appointed a member of the Order of Canada in October 1993  and invested four months later in February of the following year.  He was the recipient of the Queen Elizabeth II Golden Jubilee Medal (2002) and the Queen Elizabeth II Diamond Jubilee Medal (2012).  Abella later received the Order of Ontario in 2014 "for his contribution to documenting the story of Jewish Canadians, and his commitment to the principles of social justice and tolerance."

Publications 
 Nationalism, Communism and Canadian Labour (1973) 
 On Strike: Six Key Labour Struggles in Canada 1919–1949 (1974) 
 The Canadian Worker in the Twentieth Century (co-editor, 1978) 
 None Is Too Many: Canada and the Jews of Europe 1933–1948 (with Harold Troper, 1982) 
 A Coat of Many Colours: Two Centuries of Jewish Life in Canada (1990)

See also
 Harold Troper
 VisionTV

References

External links
 York University Curriculum Vitae
 Elizabeth Lumley (Editor),Canadian Who's Who 2006 University of Toronto Press, 2006 

1940 births
2022 deaths
Historians from Ontario
20th-century Canadian male writers
Historians of Canada
Fellows of the Royal Society of Canada
Jewish Canadian writers
Canadian Jewish Congress
Jewish historians
Members of the Order of Canada
Members of the Order of Ontario
Writers from Toronto
University of Toronto alumni
Academic staff of York University
Labor historians
20th-century Canadian non-fiction writers
Canadian male non-fiction writers
Presidents of the Canadian Historical Association
Canadian television executives
Academic staff of Glendon College